Ashk[tear] is a Pakistani drama serial written by Zafar Mairaj. It is directed by Sarmad Sultan Khoosat and produced by Abdullah Kadwani and Humayun Saeed.The project was headed by Faysal Manzoor.  It aired every Tuesday at 8:35pm on GEO TV. Its Slogan is, 'Love Perfected Through Pain'. The title song is composed by Waqar Ali and sung by Sajjad Ali.It ended in November 2012. It aired on Zindagi channel in India under the same title.

Plot
Fawad Khan as Rohail is on his way to marry his cousin Mehr-u-Nisa (Resham) in Pakistan. Rohail has never experienced the sweetness or the pain of love, though his friend back at home in Turkey, Madiha (Mehreen Raheel) has only loved him. Madiha is not happy. She tries to stop him but is unable to. Mehr-u-Nisa’s only sister, Zaib-u-Nisa (Neelam Muneer) venerates her and devises a master plan to test Rohail. Rohail falls in love with Zaib-u-Nisa. Even her imperfections appear perfect to him as reason is powerless in the face of love. Will his love stand the test of time?

Cast
 Fawad Khan as Rohail Hayat
 Seemi Raheel as Rohail's Mother
 Resham as Mehru (Mehrunissa)
 Mehreen Raheel as Madiha
 Neelam Munir as Zebu (Zebunnissa)
 Sohail Sameer as Bilal
 Mohsin Gillani as Mansoor
 Irfan Khoosat as Ramzan (Bilal's father)
 Shafqat Cheema as Dinga
 Tipu Shareef as Bhedi Singh

References

 http://www.harpalgeo.tv/
 
 https://www.facebook.com/

Pakistani drama television series
Geo TV original programming
Urdu-language television shows